Deep Trouble may refer to:

 Deep Trouble (radio comedy series), a 2005–2007 BBC radio programme
 "Deep Trouble" (NCIS: Los Angeles), a television episode
 Deep Trouble (Goosebumps), a 1994 novel by R. L. Stine
 Deep Trouble, a 1991 Hardy Boys Casefiles novel

See also
 
 
 "Deep, Deep Trouble", a song from the album The Simpsons Sing the Blues
 Double Trouble (disambiguation)
 Trouble (disambiguation)